Michał Teodor Joachimowski (26 September 1950 – 19 January 2014) was a triple jumper from Poland. He won three medals at the European Indoor Championships.

He was born in Żnin and represented the clubs Budowlani Bydgoszcz and Zawisza Bydgoszcz. He finished eighth at the 1972 European Indoor Championships, and seventh at the 1972 Olympic Games. He then got a silver medal at the 1973 European Indoor Championships and won gold at the 1974 European Indoor Championships setting a new world indoor record of 17.03 metres (this remains the Polish record to this day).

He did not do quite as well at the 1974 European Championships, when he placed fifth. At the 1975 European Indoor Championships he took another silver medal, and he followed with a victory at the 1975 Summer Universiade. At the 1976 Olympic Games he finished thirteenth.

He was the Polish champion in 1972, 1973, 1974, 1975, 1976 and 1978 and Polish indoor champion in 1973, 1974 and 1975. His personal best jump was 17.06 metres (55.97 ft), achieved in June 1973 in Warsaw.

References

1950 births
2014 deaths
People from Żnin County
Sportspeople from Kuyavian-Pomeranian Voivodeship
Polish male triple jumpers
Athletes (track and field) at the 1972 Summer Olympics
Athletes (track and field) at the 1976 Summer Olympics
Olympic athletes of Poland
Universiade medalists in athletics (track and field)
Zawisza Bydgoszcz athletes
Universiade gold medalists for Poland
Medalists at the 1975 Summer Universiade